Spartans Football Club, or Spartans FC for short, is an Anguillan grassroots football club based at the Albena Lake-Hodge Comprehensive School in The Valley. The team finished fourth in the AFA Senior Male League during the 2015–16 season.

References

External links 
 [https://

Alhcs Spartan
AFA Senior Male League clubs
Association football clubs established in 2014
2014 establishments in Anguilla